The Dark House is a 2009 Polish horror/drama film directed by Wojciech Smarzowski.

Plot
Edward Środoń, an unemployed zootechnician from Mosty with a dark past and a growing drinking problem, tries to start over with a clean slate. He sets out to the Bieszczady Mountains to take up a job there at the local State Agricultural Farm. 

A twist of events makes him stop over for the night at the house of the Dziabas family. The initial feelings of mutual distrust between the guest and his hosts are softened with consecutive rounds of moonshine. 

Środoń slowly learns more about the family and its own problems. The unfolding story is intertwined with a parallel one which sees Środoń four years later, during martial law in Poland, taking part in a reenactment of the events that took place at the Dziabas house during his visit. The reenactment is led by Lieutenant Mróz from the Civic Militia who is slowly unveiling the truth about what happened four years before, at the same time being troubled by ghosts of his own past.

Cast 
 Arkadiusz Jakubik – Edward Środoń
 Marian Dziędziel – Zdzisław Dziabas
 Kinga Preis – Bożena Dziabasowa
 Bartłomiej Topa – Mróz
 Katarzyna Cynke – Maria Lisowska / Grażyna Środoniowa
 Robert Wabich – Lisowski
 Robert Więckiewicz – Prosecutor Tomala
Eryk Lubos
Grzegorz Wojdon
Robert Wabich
Katarzyna Cynke
Krzysztof Czeczot
Lech Dyblik
Marek Juchniewicz
Bartosz Żukowski
Sławomir Orzechowski
Przemysław Witowski
Anna Grzeszczak-Hutek
Krzysztof Domaszczyński
Mariusz Jakus
Dorota Piasecka
Paweł Miśkowiec
Agnieszka Matysiak
Jerzy Rogalski
Maciej Maciejewski
Michał Gadomski
Zbigniew Paterak

External links

References 

2009 films
Polish drama films
2000s Polish-language films
2009 drama films